Samuli Kankaanperä (born March 4, 1992) is a Finnish ice hockey defenceman. His is currently playing with JYP-Akatemia in the Finnish Mestis.

Kankaanperä made his SM-liiga debut playing with JYP Jyväskylä during the 2011–12 season.

References

External links

1992 births
Living people
Finnish ice hockey defencemen
JYP Jyväskylä players
Sportspeople from Jyväskylä
21st-century Finnish people